Pongamia velutina is a species of legume in the family Fabaceae. It is found only in Papua New Guinea. It is threatened by habitat loss.

Sources
 Eddowes, P.J. 1998. Pongamia velutina. 2006 IUCN Red List of Threatened Species. Downloaded on 19 July 2007.

Millettieae
Flora of Papua New Guinea
Vulnerable plants
Taxonomy articles created by Polbot